Eriogonum tiehmii, known as Tiehm's buckwheat, is a species of flowering plant endemic to the Silver Peak Range of Esmeralda County, Nevada in the United States. Its only known population is at high risk of destruction due to proposed mining for lithium (used for batteries in electric vehicles) by Australian company Ioneer. In 2020, a noticeable decline in the known population was attributed to the mining operation.

Taxonomy
It was first formally named by American botanist James L. Reveal in 1985 in The Great Basin Naturalist. Reveal named the plant for Arnold "Jerry" Tiehm who first collected the species in 1983, while working at the New York Botanical Garden and hiking through the American West in search of new plants.

Description
It flowers briefly in the spring, after rains, with a small round yellow bloom.

Conservation status
Tiehm's buckwheat is considered critically imperiled ("at very high risk of extinction or elimination") due to its small population, small habitat and threat from mining activities; Tiehm was once quoted as saying "you could wipe the buckwheat out with a bulldozer in a couple of hours". Mining exploration has increased the prevalence of invasive species in its habitat.  a planned  open cast lithium mine by Ioneer is expected to destroy up to 90% of the habitat and approximately 50–70% of the known population. There have been efforts by conservation groups, including the Center for Biological Diversity, to gain federal protection for the species and block mining exploration in its habitat, and research funded by Ioneer has been conducted to investigate a possible relocation of the plants, but results have shown that the buckwheat does not react well to soil from other locations, having evolved for the combination of lithium, boron and clay in its current habitat.

Dan Patterson, a whistleblower from the Bureau of Land Management who previously worked for the Centre for Biological Diversity, accused Ioneer of applying for exploration permits in a manner designed to avoid environmental reviews, which can be time-consuming and costly. Patterson filed a larger complaint arguing that the BLM district office had a pattern of rapid approval of projects without appropriate concern for environmental laws, turning the region into a "clearinghouse for federal permits" and under-staffed mining inspections, perhaps related to a Trump administration directive to "increase activity at all levels of the supply chain" relating to critical minerals such as lithium that,  is predominantly imported to the United States rather than produced domestically.

Between July and September 2020, over 17,000 plants, or over 40% of the population, were destroyed with massive damage to the habitat. Conservation biologists at the University of Nevada, Reno, land management agencies, and Ioneer, theorized that the damage was caused by burrowing rodents, supported by evidence from wildlife surveys and game cameras. However, other groups like the Center for Biological Diversity and Eriogonum researcher Benjamin Grady disagreed, and instead theorized that systematic, targeted vandalism was the cause of the losses, with botanist Naomi Fraga stating that it was only the Eriogonum that had been torn up and "strewn about — thousands and thousands of plants all across the habitat ... it wasn't happening to any other plants". Subsequent surveys have noted similar damage to storage organs in nearby desert plants, presumably caused by rodents seeking water in an exceptionally dry year. This has prompted calls for increased protection of the plants, rehabilitation of the affected area, and a further block on any exploration in the area.

In 2021, the United States Fish and Wildlife Service along with recognized conservationists, such as Dr. Benjamin Grady, issued a proposal to list Eriogonum tiehmii under the Endangered Species Act, stating that the mining project at Rhyolite Ridge could have "an immense impact on the overall resiliency and continued viability of the species," as the subpopulation threatened by the mine is also the most productive at recruitment. The Fish and Wildlife Service failed to issue a final rule on the proposal within a year, as required by federal law. The plant was declared endangered in December 2022.

References

tiehmii
Flora of Nevada
Plants described in 1985